Tangzhong, also known as a water roux or yu-dane is a paste of flour cooked in water or milk to over  which is used to improve the texture of bread and increase the amount of time it takes to stale.

Tangzhong is a gel, which helps stabilize the wheat starches in the bread, to prevent recrystallization which is the main cause of staling.

Technique 
For  the flour is mixed with an equal weight of boiling water poured over it. This mixture then holds moisture so that, when it is added to a bread mix, the dough bakes with a soft, fluffy texture and the bread then keeps for longer.

The gelatinized roux is generally used at a moderate temperature and apparently also contributes to slightly greater rise during baking.

The gelatinized flour is more stable than normal bread dough, which normally tends to crystalize, creating stale bread. Because the water roux blocks that process the bread keeps longer.

Tangzhong works predominantly by developing starches into a paste, which functions as an emulsifier, similar to how egg yolks or lecithin work when included in dough. The starch emulsion retains moisture and slows the migration of moisture from inside the finished bread toward the crust, extending shelf life. Tangzhong is usually not heated above 65°C, as this temperature is sufficient to develop a paste. Higher temperatures will harden the paste and render it useless.

The predominant principle of Yudane is using heat to activate amylase naturally present in the flour and causing it to rapidly alter the chemistry of starches to produce sugars and other smaller chains of carbohydrate. Whereas typically bread starches begin to crystallize after baking and even attach to the gluten, the smaller chains produced by Yudane resist crystallisation and attachment, slowing hardening and staling of the bread. 

To summarise: Tangzhong relies mainly on emulsion, Yudane on enzymes.

History 
"Scalding" flour, especially rye flour, for baking is a technique that has been used for centuries.

The Pasco Shikishima Corporation was granted a patent in Japan for making bread using the  method in 2001. The  method was then modified by Taiwanese pastry chef Yvonne Chen, who published a book in 2007 called 65°C Bread Doctor, borrowing the Japanese term  directly. This book popularized the technique throughout Asia.

She subsequently wrote more than twenty recipes using the method, which helped popularize the technique in the English-speaking world.

See also
 Roux

References

Further reading

 

Baking